Kudumbam Oru Kovil is a 1987 Indian Tamil-language film, directed by A. C. Tirulokchandar and produced by Anandavalli Balaji. The film stars Sivaji Ganesan, Lakshmi, Murali and Ranjini. The movie is a remake of 1985 Hindi film Ghar Dwaar. The film had music by M. Ranga Rao who also composed for the Kannada version Maneye Manthralaya (1986).

Cast 
Sivaji Ganesan
Lakshmi as Parvathy
Murali
Ranjini
V. K. Ramasamy
Janagaraj
Poovilangu Mohan
Raja Sulochana
Jayamalini
Bindu Ghosh

Soundtrack 
Soundtrack was composed by M. Ranga Rao and lyrics were written by Pulamaipithan.
"Kudumbam Oru Koil" – S. P. Balasubrahmanyam, K. S. Chithra
"Manmadhan Koil" – SPB, K. S. Chithra
"Dilruba Raja" – Vani Jairam
"Kudu Kudu" – SPB, Vani Jairam

Release and reception 
Kudumbam Oru Koyil was released on 26 January 1987, India's Republic Day. N. Krishnaswamy of The Indian Express wrote, "For a major part of the film, Tirulokchander curiously keeps the teartaps closed or just dribbling but in the end there is a patch that is meant to trigger a flood of tears."

References

External links 
 

1980s Tamil-language films
1987 films
Films directed by A. C. Tirulokchandar
Films scored by M. Ranga Rao
Indian drama films
Tamil remakes of Hindi films